Lake Norman of Iredell is a census-designated place (CDP) in Iredell County, North Carolina, United States. It was first listed as a CDP prior to the 2020 census.

The community is in the southwestern corner of Iredell County and consists of several peninsulas extending into Lake Norman, a large reservoir on the Catawba River. The CDP is bordered to the northeast by the city of Mooresville and to the south, across an arm of the lake, by the town of Cornelius in Mecklenburg County. The CDP is bordered to the southwest, across the main channel of the lake, by the CDP of Westport in Lincoln County, and to the northwest, also across the main channel, by the CDP of Lake Norman of Catawba in Catawba County.

References 

Census-designated places in Iredell County, North Carolina
Census-designated places in North Carolina